University Park Historic District is a national historic district located in the University Heights neighborhood of Buffalo in Erie County, New York. It has 489 contributing buildings, 1 contributing site, and 4 contributing structures adjacent to the south campus of the University at Buffalo.  The district is exclusively residential, with homes built starting in 1913.  The home are in popular architectural styles from the inter-war period including American Foursquare, American Craftsmanm Bungalow, and Colonial Revival. The contributing site is the overall design and layout of the subdivision and the contributing structures are distinctive entry gates to the community. Located in the district is the separately listed Edward A. Diebolt House.

It was listed on the National Register of Historic Places in 2011.

References

Houses on the National Register of Historic Places in New York (state)
Historic districts in Buffalo, New York
Houses in Buffalo, New York
Commercial buildings on the National Register of Historic Places in New York (state)
Colonial Revival architecture in New York (state)
Historic districts on the National Register of Historic Places in New York (state)
Architecture of Buffalo, New York
National Register of Historic Places in Buffalo, New York